Don Parish may refer to:

 Don Parish (American football) (1948–2018), American football linebacker
 Don Parish (rugby league) (born 1937), rugby league player and coach

See also 
 Don Bosco Parish, a parish located at Trancoville, Baguio City, Philippines